Events in the year 1939 in the British Mandate of Palestine.

Incumbents
 High Commissioner – Sir Harold MacMichael
 Emir of Transjordan – Abdullah I bin al-Hussein
 Prime Minister of Transjordan – Tawfik Abu al-Huda

Events
 7 February  – 17 March – The London Conference at St. James's Palace is held in an attempt to resolve the future of the British Mandate over Palestine. The conference ends without making any progress.
 27 February – 38 Arab Palestinians killed and 44 injured when a number of bombs exploded across the country during the morning.
 2 March – The first broadcast of the underground radio station of the Irgun "Kol Tsion HaLokhemet".
 27 March – Abdul Rahim al Hajj Mohammed, a Palestinian leader was ambushed and killed by the British Army.
 2 May – The founding of the kibbutz Dahlia
 3 May – The founding of the kibbutz Dafna
 4 May – The founding of the kibbutz Dan
 8 May – The founding of the kibbutz Sde Eliyahu
 17 May – The British government issues the White Paper of 1939, following the failure of the London Conference and the continued Arab revolt, which abandons the idea of partitioning, sharply restricts Jewish immigration into Palestine and places severe restrictions on the rights of Jews to buy land from Arabs.
 23 May – The founding of the kibbutz Mahanayim
 23 May – The founding of the moshav Shadmot Dvora
 23 May – The founding of the kibbutz HaZore'im
 23 May – The founding of the kibbutz Kfar Glikson
 28 May – The founding of the moshav Mishmar HaYam
 23 June – The founding of the kibbutz Hamadia
 26 June – The founding of the moshav Kfar Netter
 12 July – The founding of the kibbutz Negba
 13 August – The founding of the kibbutz Gesher
 29 October – The founding of the kibbutz Amir

Unknown dates
 The founding of the kibbutz Beit Oren
 The founding of the kibbutz Afek
 The founding of the moshav Kfar Warburg

Births
 3 January – Arik Einstein, Israeli singer-songwriter (died 2013) 
 10 February – Yuval Zaliouk, Israeli-American conductor
 12 February – Yael Dayan, Israeli politician and author
 4 March – Zvi Mazel, Israeli diplomat
 23 March – Itamar Even-Zohar, Israeli cultural researcher
 11 April – Aharon Shabtai, Israeli poet 
 22 April – Ori Orr, Israeli general and politician
 27 April – Gideon Ariel, Israeli Olympic athlete and biomechanist
 3 May – Adir Zik, Israeli television producer and journalist (died 2005)
 4 May – Amos Oz, Israeli writer, novelist, and journalist (died 2018)
 22 June – Ada Yonath, Israeli crystallographer, recipient of the Nobel Prize in Chemistry
 30 June – Giora Lev, Israeli general and politician, 7th Mayor of Petah Tikva
 8 July – Abdelhamid Sharaf, former Jordanian Prime Minister (died 1980)
 14 July – Siona Shimshi, Israeli painter, sculptor, ceramist, and textile designer
 17 July – Shabtai Shavit, Israeli military officer and Mossad director
 22 July – Gila Almagor, Israeli actress and author
 24 July – Tamar Adar, Israeli writer (died 2008)
 15 August – Yisrael Ariel, Israeli rabbi
 16 August – Ram Caspi, Israeli lawyer
 17 August – Gideon Sagi, Israeli politician
 24 August – Yehoshua Sobol, Israeli playwright, writer, and director
 26 August – Pinchas Goldstein, Israeli politician (died 2007)
 9 September – Reuven Rivlin, Israeli politician, current President of Israel and former Speaker of the Knesset
 16 September – Yaakov Neeman, Israeli politician (died 2017)
 19 September – Moshe Weinberg, Israeli wrestling coach, murdered at the Munich Olympics (died 1972)
 24 September – Moti Kirschenbaum, Israeli journalist and media personality
 29 September – Yoel Schwartz, Haredi rabbi, author and teacher (died 2022) 
 13 October – Gideon Tish, Israeli football player 
 10 November – Sakher Habash, Palestinian Arab politician, a leader of the Fatah movement (died 2009)
 24 December – Avihu Ben-Nun, Israeli fighter pilot, commander of the Israeli Air Force
 28 December – Yehoram Gaon, Israeli singer, actor, television host, and author
 Full date unknown
 Hakam Balawi, Palestinian Arab writer and member of Palestinian Legislative Council
 Ghada Karmi, Palestinian Arab doctor of medicine, author and academic
 Samih al-Qasim, Transjordanian-born Israeli Druze poet
 Avner Shalev, Israeli general, director of Yad Vashem

References

 
Mandatory Palestine
1930s in Mandatory Palestine
Palestine
Mandatory Palestine
Mandatory Palestine in World War II